Hasan bey Prishtina ( and Vulçitrnli Hasan Bey), originally known as Hasan Berisha (27 September 1873 – 13 August 1933), was an Ottoman, later Albanian politician, who served as the 8th Prime Minister of Albania in December 1921.

Biography

Family and early life
In his memoirs Prishtina wrote that his family originated from Poljance in the Drenica region, where his ancestors gave valuable contribution to the Albanian culture and revolts against the Ottoman Empire. He wrote that his grandparent Haxhi Ali Berisha, who moved to Vıçıtırın/Vushtrri in 1871, was the son of Abdullah Ali Berisha. Haxhi's younger son, Ahmet was the father of Hasan. Prishtina said that family's links to the Drenica region were celebrated with songs and other traditions. The Berisha family was autochthonous to the province of Dukagjini, where Vushtrri is also part. Archival research done by Muhamet Pirraku confirms Hasan Prishtina's writings, and points that some documents give an alternative name of Abdullah Ali Berisha, Mehmet. Hasan was born in 1873 in Vıçıtırın/Vushtrri and had one brother named Ymer. After finishing the French gymnasium in Thessaloniki, he studied politics and law in Istanbul. He was originally known as "Hasan Berisha".

He initially supported the Young Turk Revolution of 1908. Prishtina was elected to the Ottoman parliament in 1908 and became affiliated to the Young Turk (CUP) party. He changed his last name into Prishtina in 1908, when he was elected as the Pristina delegate in the Ottoman parliament in Istanbul during the Second Constitutional Era. Actions by the Ottoman government against rebels and civilians in Kosovo during 1909 led Prishtina to publish an article titled "Albanians" in the Young Turk newspaper Tanin. He stressed that force was unproductive and unable to bring peace and security while reforms were needed following the example of Midhat Pasha. As a parliamentarian Prishtina viewed the place of Albanians in the empire as partners entitled in the decision-making process which was partly based upon ethnic politics. He expressed that sentiment in an analogy delivered to parliament in early May 1911. Prishtina defined the Ottoman state as a "joint stock company with common interest... owned by Turks, Albanians, and other peoples, [all] with equal shares" and without anyone "deserving preferential treatment". By late 1911, Prishtina had joined the Freedom and Accord Party which was founded by him and ten others who were opponents of the Young Turks and advocated for Ottomanism, government decentralisation and the rights of ethnic minorities. In 1911 Prishtina wrote a chapter on the revolt by Albanian highlanders (Malësors) and highlighted their important duties involving border defense in an edited book titled Musaver Arnavud (The Illustrated Albanian) in Ottoman Turkish by Dervish Hima.

Albanian National Movement
During December 1911, Prishtina and Ismail Qemali convened secret meetings of Albanian political notables in Istanbul that decided to organise a future Albanian uprising. Mehmed V dissolved parliament and called for new elections on 17 January 1912 with Prishtina going to Kosovo shortly thereafter to begin the organisation of the uprising. In the Ottoman elections of April 1912, the CUP won most parliamentary seats by rigging the election and prevented its Albanian critics like Prishtina from retaining their positions. After the Ottoman Government did not keep their promises for more rights and independence to the Albania nation, Hasan Prishtina and several other prominent Albanian intellectuals started organizing the Albanian National Movement. He together with Isa Boletini and Bajram Curri took the responsibility to start the Albanian National Movement in Kosovo. In 1912, due to the deteriorating situation between Albanians and Ottoman authorities, Prishtina alongside other Albanian leaders were present at a meeting in Junik on 20 May where a besa (pledge) was given to wage war on the Young Turk government.

Prishtina took an active part in the 1912 uprising in Kosovo and formulated the autonomy demands that were submitted to the Turkish government in August 1912, the so-called Fourteen Points of Hasan Prishtina.

Until August 1912, Prishtina led the Albanian rebels to gain control over the whole Kosovo vilayet (including Novi Pazar, Sjenica, Priština and even Skopje), part of Scutari Vilayet (including Elbasan, Përmet, Leskovik and Konitsa in Janina Vilayet and Debar in Monastir Vilayet. Marshall Ibrahim Pasha was sent by the Ottomans to negotiate terms and on 9 August met with leaders of the uprising where Prishtina presented the Fourteen Points and the commander then sent them to Istanbul and returned to his army. Prishtina however retreated from insisting upon autonomy that disappointed some Albanian nationalists. On 18 August, the moderate faction led by Prishtina managed to convince leaders Boletini, Curri, Riza Bey Gjakova and Idriz Seferi of the conservative group to accept the agreement with the Ottomans for Albanian sociopolitical and cultural rights. In assisting to formulate the Fourteen Points, in part secured by Kosovo Albanian military action against the Ottomans, Prishtina in his role as a Kosovar notable and Albanian patriot balanced national and regional concerns.

Albanian Independence and World War I
During the Balkan Wars he was arrested by commanders from the Kingdom of Serbia. In December 1913, after Albanian independence, he served as Minister of Agriculture, and in March 1914 was made minister of postal services in the government of Independent Albania led by Ismail Qemali.

During the First World War he organized divisions of volunteers to fight for Austria-Hungary. In 1918, after the Serb recapture of Kosovo from Austria-Hungary, Prishtina, together with Bajram Curri, fled to Vienna and later to Rome, where he was in contact with Croatian, Macedonian and Montenegrin opponents of the new Kingdom of Yugoslavia. Hasan Prishtina became a head of the Committee for the National Defence of Kosovo in Rome in 1918.

Political career

Hasan Prishtina was in charge of the delegation of the Committee in December 1919 which represented Albanians for the protection of their rights in the Paris Peace Conference, where he requested the unification of Kosovo and Albania.  The Kosovar delegation was, however, not given leave to participate in the debates.

Prishtina then returned to Albania where in January 1920 he helped organise the Congress of Lushnjë and in April 1921 became a member of parliament for Dibra. He took part in a coup d'état that year and served as Prime Minister for a brief five days from 7 to 12 December, but was forced out of office by Ahmet Zogu, who was a Minister of Interior at that time and regarded it as imperative to avoid conflict with Belgrade.

Thereafter, Hasan helped organise uprisings in Kosovo and led several anti-government insurrections in Albania, the latter being easily suppressed by the administrations of Xhafer Bej Ypi and Ahmet Zogu.

He returned to Tirana during the Democratic Revolution of 1924 under Fan Noli, whom he accompanied to the League of Nations in Geneva.

Exile and death
When Zogu took power in December 1924, Prishtina was forced to leave Albania. As he could not return to Kosovo, he settled in Thessalonika where he purchased a large estate. Prishtina was an enemy of Zogu, the two having attempted to assassinate one another. He was imprisoned by the Yugoslav police for a period, but was released in 1931. In 1933, he was killed by Ibrahim Celo in a cafe in Thessalonika, on the orders of the Yugoslav government.

Legacy
Hasan Prishtina is commemorated in Kosovo and Albania. In 1993, when a meeting commemorating the 60th anniversary of his death was convened in Mitrovica, Serbian police raided the place and showed machine guns to the participants. Out of 80 participants, 37 were arrested and the rest were beaten for 5 to 15 minutes by police. In 2012 a statue of Prishtina was elevated in Skopje in Skanderbeg Square . Hasan Bej Prishtina is honoured by the Albanians as an important national hero and freedom fighter. A primary school in Tirana and the University of Prishtina are named after him. On 2 May 2014, he was posthumously awarded the Order of Merit of the National Flag by the Albanian President Bujar Nishani.

See also 
 History of Albania
 List of prime ministers of Albania

References

Sources

Further reading 

1873 births
1933 deaths
People from Drenas
People from Kosovo vilayet
Kosovo Albanians
Politicians of the Ottoman Empire
19th-century Albanian politicians
20th-century Albanian politicians
Kosovan politicians
People murdered in Greece
Government ministers of Albania
Prime Ministers of Albania
Prisoners and detainees of Yugoslavia
Albanians from the Ottoman Empire
Assassinations in Greece
Istanbul University Faculty of Law alumni